Theliderma is a genus of freshwater mussels, aquatic bivalve mollusks in the family Unionidae. They are native to North America.

This genus is sometimes classified in an expanded Quadrula.

Species within the genus Theliderma
Note: Taxa with a "†" symbol are extinct due to human activity
 Theliderma cylindrica - Rabbitsfoot
 Theliderma intermedia - Cumberland monkeyface
 Theliderma metanevra - Monkeyface
 Theliderma sparsa -  Appalachian monkeyface
 †Theliderma stapes - Stirrup shell
 †Theliderma tuberosa - Rough rockshell

 
Bivalve genera